is a former Japanese football player.

Playing career
Kawamoto was born in Kanagawa Prefecture on June 12, 1971. He played for Verdy Kawasaki until 1995. Although he played many matches as right and left side back, he could not become a regular player behind Satoshi Tsunami, Tadashi Nakamura and Ko Ishikawa. From 1995, he played for Japan Football League club Brummell Sendai (1995) and Tosu Futures (1996). He retired end of 1996 season.

Club statistics

References

External links

1971 births
Living people
Association football people from Kanagawa Prefecture
Japanese footballers
J1 League players
Japan Football League (1992–1998) players
Tokyo Verdy players
Vegalta Sendai players
Sagan Tosu players
Association football defenders